Anzac Square may refer to:

 ANZAC Square, Brisbane — ANZAC Square in Brisbane, Australia
 Anzac Square, Dunedin — Anzac Square in Dunedin, New Zealand